Zoe Uphill (born 8 September 1982 in Canberra, Australian Capital Territory, Australia) is an Australian rower. She competed in the women's quadruple sculls at the 2008 Summer Olympics.

References

Living people
Australian female rowers
Olympic rowers of Australia
Rowers at the 2008 Summer Olympics
Sportspeople from Canberra
1982 births
Australian netball players
Sydney Sandpipers players
Australian Institute of Sport netball players
Netball players from the Australian Capital Territory
21st-century Australian women